This is a list of television episodes from the Japanese cartoon series , based on the Psychiatrist Irabu series of short stories. The only season of the show aired between October 15 and December 24, 2009 and consisted of 11 episodes, half hour per episode. It has been released on DVD with English subtitles in region 4 on February 18, 2011.



Episode list

References

Lists of anime episodes
Lists of comedy-drama television series episodes